Jane Bugaeva (born August 26, 1986 in Saint Petersburg, Russia) is an American figure skater. She won the gold medal at the 2004 Bofrost Cup on Ice, her first senior international event. She won the silver medal at the 2004 Junior Grand Prix event in Belgrade and just missed qualifying for the Junior Grand Prix Final. She became a U.S. citizen around 2007.

Results

References

External links 
 
 Tracings.net profile

American female single skaters
1986 births
Living people
Figure skaters from Saint Petersburg
21st-century American women